The Red Ochre Award is an annual art award for Indigenous Australian artists.

Background and description

The Red Ochre Award was established in 1993 by  the Australia Council for the Arts.

It is awarded annually to an outstanding Indigenous Australian (Aboriginal Australian or Torres Strait Islander) artist for lifetime achievement.  is one of four categories awarded at the First Nations Arts Awards (formerly National Indigenous Arts Awards) on 27 May each year.

Recipients

2020s 
Stephen Page AO (2022)
Destiny Deacon (2022)
Yorna (Donny) Woolagoodja (2021)
Dr Lou Bennett AM (2021)
Alison Milyika Carroll (2020)
Djon Mundine OAM (2020)

2010s 
Jack Charles (2019)
Lola Greeno (2019)
Mavis Ngallametta (2018)
John Mawurndjul AM (2018)
Lynette Narkle (2017)
 Ken Thaiday Snr (2017)
Yvonne Koolmatrie (2016)
 Dr Gary Foley (2015)
Hector Burton (2014)
David Gulpilil AM (2013)
Warren H. Williams (2012)
Archie Roach (2011)
Michael Leslie (2010)

2000s 
Gawirrin Gumana AO (2009)
Doris Pilkington Garimara AM (2008)
 (2007)
Tom E. Lewis (2006)
Seaman Dan (2005)
Johnny Bulunbulun (2004)
Jimmy Little (2003)
Dorothy Peters AM (2002)
Banduk Marika AO (2001)
Mervyn Bishop (2000)

1990s 
Justine Saunders OAM (1999)
Bob Maza AM (1998)
Jimmy Chi (1997)
Maureen Watson (1996)
The Mills Sisters (1995)
Mick Namarari Tjapaltjarri (1994)
Eva Johnson (1993)

References 

Awards established in 1993
Arts awards in Australia